FC Sulori is a Georgian football club based in the town of Vani. They currently take part in Liga 4, the forth tier of Georgian league system. 

The team has spent two seasons in the top flight. 

They play their home games at Grigol Nikoleishvili Stadium.

History
Sulori became champions of the Georgian Soviet league in 1969. This success enabled the club to participate in the Soviet Second Minor league the next year, which they finished in the 10th place among 18 teams. 

By claiming seven titles within nine years, Sulori became one of the leading members of the republican league in 1980s. In the same period twice in a row they clinched the Georgian Cup as well. 

When the national championship was formed, the team won the second division in 1990 and gained promotion to the tier. However, after two seasons they were relegated. The only attempt to return to Umaglesi Liga via play-offs was unsuccessful in 1999.

In 2016, the team knocked out three opponents, including two top-tier teams, and reached the Cup quarterfinals, where they were beaten with a narrow margin by Torpedo Kutaisi, the future Cup winners of the season. 

The team had an unusual achievement in the victorious 2015-16 season when they recorded an unbeaten run in the 3rd division. The club moved back to Pirveli Liga, although their tenure there lasted one season only. Following another relegation two years later Sulori reached their lowest point in 2019, when they competed in the regional league. 

Since 2020 Sulori have been playing in the fourth league.

Players
As of April 2022

 (C)

Honours
Georgian Soviet Championship
 Champion: 1969
Silver Medal Winner: 1980, 1983, 1984, 1988
Bronze Medal Winner: 1982
Georgian Soviet Cup
 Winner: 1980, 1981
Pirveli Liga
 Champion: 1990
Bronze Medal Winner: 1999
Meore Liga
Winner: 2015-16 (Group A)
Runners-up: 2014-15
Regionuli Liga
Winner: 2019 (West)

Seasons
{|class="wikitable"
|-bgcolor="#efefef"
! Season
! League
! Pos.
! Pl.
! W
! D
! L
! GF
! GA
! P
! Notes
|-
|2011–12
|bgcolor=#ffa07a|Pirveli Liga West
| 9th of 10
| 18
| 6 
| 2
| 10
| 11
| 35
| 12
|
|-
|-
|2012-13 
|bgcolor=#ffa07a|Pirveli Liga Group A
| 11th of 12
| 33
| 7 
| 4
| 22
| 30
| 72
| 25
|
|-
|-
|2013-14 
|bgcolor=#ffa07a|Pirveli Liga Group B
| 14th of 14
| 26
| 2
| 3
| 21
| 14
| 59
| 9
|Relegated
|-
|-
|2014-15
|bgcolor=#98bb98|Meore Liga West
| 2nd of 15
| 28
| 24
| 3
| 1
| 87
| 10
| 75
|
|-
|-
|2015-16
|bgcolor=#98bb98|Meore Liga West
| 1st of 14
| 26
| 23
| 3
| 0
| 14
| 77
| 13
|Promoted
|-
|-
|2016 
|bgcolor=#ffa07a|Pirveli Liga Group A
| 5th of 9
| 16
| 7
| 3
| 6
| 20
| 21
| 21
|Relegation round, lost
|-
|-
|rowspan="2"|2017
|bgcolor=#98bb98|Liga 3 Group B
| 6th of 10
| 18
| 7
| 3
| 8
| 20
| 19
| 24
|
|-
|-
|bgcolor=#98bb98|Relegation Group
| 4th of 10
| 18
| 9
| 3
| 6
| 20
| 21
| 30
|
|-
|-
|2018
|bgcolor=#98bb98|Liga 3 
| 18th of 20
| 30
| 10
| 6
| 22
| 38
| 77
| 36
|Relegated
|-
|-
|2019
|bgcolor=silver|Regionuli Liga West 
| 1st of 10
| 18
| 15
| 1
| 2
| 40
| 13
| 46
|Promoted
|-
|2020
|bgcolor=cc9966|Liga 4 White Group
| 8th of 8
| 14
| 2
| 4
| 8
| 10
| 20
| 10
|
|-
|-
|rowspan="2"|2021
|bgcolor=cc9966|Liga 4 Red Group
|5th of 10 
| 18
| 8
| 5
| 5
| 31
| 15
| 29
|
|-
|-
|bgcolor=cc9966|Promotion Group
|7th of 10 
| 18
| 7
| 2
| 9
| 21
| 27
| 23
|
|-
|2022
|bgcolor=cc9966|Liga 4 
| 7th of 16
| 30
| 12
| 5
| 13
| 35
| 40
| 41
|
|-
|}

Name
Sulori is a balneological resort, situated in 11 km from the town of Vani.

References

External links
 Page on Soccerway
 Facebook page

Sulori Vani
Vani
1932 establishments in Georgia (country)